Benjamin Cummings Truman (October 25, 1835 – July 18, 1916), was an American journalist and author; in particular, he was a distinguished war correspondent during the American Civil War, and an authority on duels.

He was born in Providence, Rhode Island and attended public school in Providence, followed by a Shaker school in Canterbury, New Hampshire.  After a year administering a district school in Merrimack County, New Hampshire, he returned to Providence and learned typesetting. He was a compositor and a proofreader for The New York Times from 1855 to 1859, and later worked for John W. Forney in Philadelphia at the Press, and in Washington, D.C. for the Sunday Morning Chronicle.

When the Civil War began, he became a war correspondent, then declined a commission in 1862 to become a staff aide to Andrew Johnson, military governor of Tennessee, and Generals James S. Negley, John H. King and Kenner Garrard.

From Duelling in America 1992:
After the Civil War, Truman had a variety of jobs, serving for a time as a special agent of the Post Office Department on the West Coast, before going back into newspaper work. He shifted into public relations in the 1880s, promoting the state of California both in this country and abroad. After the turn of the century, he toured the Near East as a correspondent.

Besides his journalistic endeavors, Truman wrote numerous books, including several on California history, and even produced two plays. He is best known, however, for his work as a Civil War correspondent. Through energy, resourcefulness, and not a little luck, he was often able to beat his rivals to press with important stories. During his extensive travels in the South, he sent many insightful letters to the New York Times, documents that are considered some of the most important resources of the Reconstruction Era.

For his book The Field of Honor (1884), Truman collected accounts of significant European and American duels that illustrated the many variations of the code duello, as it was then known. The American portion of the book was reprinted as Duelling in America.

Truman owned five newspapers, including the San Diego Bulletin, where he lived for a time. He died on July 18, 1916 in Los Angeles, California.

References

 Dumas Malone, ed. Dictionary of American Biography. vol. X, part 1. Charles Scribner's Sons, New York, NY. 1964.
 Major Ben C. Truman, Steven Randolph Wood, Editor Duelling in America. Joseph Tabler Books, San Diego, 1992.
 FAMOUS TIMES WRITER DIES IN CALIFORNIA; Major Ben C. Truman Served New York Times as Correspondent in Civil War and Was President Johnson's Secretary. The New York Times. July 30, 1916

1835 births
1916 deaths
The New York Times corporate staff
Journalists from Washington, D.C.
People from Providence, Rhode Island
Writers from Philadelphia
American war correspondents
People from Merrimack County, New Hampshire
Burials at Evergreen Cemetery, Los Angeles
Journalists from Pennsylvania
War correspondents of the American Civil War
19th-century American businesspeople